Balipur is a small village in Ballia district in Uttar Pradesh, India. It comes under the Post Office and Gram Panchayat Kurem. This village is mainly occupied by people with Tiwari surname. There are two other castes living here who have been brought from some other village of the same district. Since then they have been serving and assisting Tiwaris in their agricultural and household activities. This is one of the 'better' villages in the area that has a 100% literacy rate. One of the ideal village in the country. This village has produced many teachers, professors engineers and doctors. They are serving in India and abroad. The population of Balipur in 2014 was 1284.A beautiful temple of hanuman ji made by the contribution of villagers is situated near school. And in this village  an ancient and beautiful  temple of dhurga ji 
There are 5 government primary schools and one junior high school situated in this village. Yugal Purva Madhyamik Vidyalaya is one of the popular school in the area for the quality education, established in 1987 by late Shree Yugal Kishore Tiwari.A beautiful Kali Mata temple is located inside the campus of the school.

Shreemati Nisha Singh is the Gram Pradhan at present.

Villages in Ballia district